Franck Fréon (born 16 March 1962, in Paris) is a French race car driver.

He began his career in the French Renault 5 Turbo Championship in 1986 and 1987 then competed in French Formula Three from 1988 to 1989. In 1990 he competed in International Formula 3000 and failed to qualify for four of his first five race attempts, but was credited with 5th place in his first successful start although he did not finish the race. He subsequently left his team and joined another for the final two races of the year where he qualified but failed to point. His fifth place was good enough for 19th in the championship.

He moved to the United States and participated in Indy Lights from 1991 to 1993 capturing 4 wins and finishing runner up in both the 1992 and 1993 standings, behind Robbie Buhl and Bryan Herta respectively. However, he had trouble finding a good team in CART, making 4 starts (and 1 DNF) for 3 different teams in the 1994 season with a best finish of 12th in his CART debut at the Long Beach Grand Prix. 1995 wasn't much better as Fréon finished 15th in the Long Beach season opener, then failed to qualify for the Indianapolis 500 in a 3 year old Lola chassis and returned 5 months later only to fail to make the show at Laguna Seca Raceway.

Franck Fréon then ventured into endurance car racing, driving marginally competitive LMP vehicles in the 24 Hours of Le Mans from 1995 to 1999. He then signed onto the Chevrolet factory team to drive the Chevrolet Corvette C5-R. He teamed with Ron Fellows and Johnny O'Connell to win the 24 Hours of Daytona in 2001. He continued with the team until 2004.

Nearing his retirement, Franck Fréon leveraged his knowledge, experience and passion for cars to establish his business Pumpkin Fine Cars & Exotics in 1998.

Career Results

Complete International Formula 3000 results

(key) (Races in bold indicate pole position; races in italics indicate fastest lap.)

Indy Lights

CART

24 Hours of Le Mans

References

 Driver Database profile
 Racing reference profile (US results)
 Champcar Stats

1964 births
French racing drivers
Champ Car drivers
French Formula Three Championship drivers
Indy Lights drivers
Living people
International Formula 3000 drivers
British Formula 3000 Championship drivers
24 Hours of Le Mans drivers
24 Hours of Daytona drivers
American Le Mans Series drivers
Corvette Racing drivers
Dale Coyne Racing drivers
EuroInternational drivers